Uisce Beatha was a 1990s Canadian folk rock band based initially in London, Ontario and after 1993 in Halifax, Nova Scotia. The band took its name from the Irish name for whisky, meaning water of life. Their music ranged from Celtic to punk.

History 
Uisce Beatha formed in 1988 in London, with members Alan Glen on lead vocals and banjo, John Glen on mandolin and tin whistle, Paul Meadows on fiddle and harp, Damian Morrissy on bass guitar, Doug Watt on guitar and Marty Coles on drums.  Coles was later replaced by Patrick McLaughlin.

The band released two albums and two EPs as Uisce Beatha, including Voice of the Voyager in 1994. They toured regularly in both Canada and Germany.

Change of name 
They were sued in 1997 by a Scottish distillery over rights to the band name, and subsequently changed their name to Red. They released one further album under that name, The Fabulous Mushman, on which their style changed from mainly Celtic to more pop music, but subsequently broke up.

Discography

Albums 
As Uisce Beatha
 1991 – Drinking with the Lord (EP) (Independently released)
 1992 – The Mystic of the Baja (Independently released in Canada; German release on Old Songs New Songs)
 1994 – Voice of the Voyager (Atlantica Music)
 1995 – Living in a Cuckoo Clock (EP) (Independently released)

As Red
 1998 – The Fantabulous Mushman (No Records)

References 

Musical groups established in 1988
Musical groups from London, Ontario
Musical groups from Halifax, Nova Scotia
Canadian folk rock groups
Celtic fusion groups
Canadian Celtic music groups